Saanen is a municipality in the canton of Berne in Switzerland. 

Saanen may also refer to:

Saanen District, a former administrative district in the canton of Bern, Switzerland
 Saanen goat, a domesticated breed of dairy goat

See also
Sarnen